Crystal Spheres is an adventure module published in 1990 for the Advanced Dungeons & Dragons fantasy role-playing game.

Plot summary
Crystal Spheres is a Spelljammer scenario in which the player characters encounter a unique ship, called the Hummingbird, and its captain asks them to help save his homesphere from a mysterious bard called T'Lann.

Publication history
SJA3 Crystal Spheres was written by J. Paul LaFountain, with a cover by Brom, and was published by TSR in 1990 as a 64-page booklet with a poster and an outer folder.

Reception

References

Dungeons & Dragons modules
Role-playing game supplements introduced in 1990
Spelljammer